Tamsi is a mandal in Adilabad district in the state of Telangana in south India.

Demographics

According to Indian census, 2001, the demographic details of Tamsi mandal is as follows:
Total Population: 	36,164	in 7,556 Households.
Male Population: 	17,944	and Female Population: 	18,220
Children Under 6-years of age: 5,506	(Boys -2,772 and Girls - 2,734)
Total Literates: 	15,000

Tamsi village has a population of 2,925 (B) and 899 (K) in 2001.

Villages
The villages in Tamsi mandal includes: Andarbandh, Antargaon, Arli, Bandal Nagpur, 	Belsari Rampur, Bheempoor, Dhanora, Ghotkuri, Girigaon, Gomutri, Gona, Hasnapur, Jamidi, Karanji, Khapperla, Nippani, Pippalkoti, Ponnari, Tamsi, Waddadi, Wadgaon and Wadoor.

References 

Mandals in Adilabad district